Paoli station is a passenger rail station located in the western suburbs of Philadelphia at 13 Lancaster Avenue (US 30), Paoli, Pennsylvania. It is served by Amtrak's Keystone Service and Pennsylvanian trains, and most SEPTA Paoli/Thorndale Line trains. The station has Amtrak and SEPTA ticket offices, a waiting room, vending machines, restrooms, and a coffee shop. The one-story tan brick building was constructed by the Pennsylvania Railroad in 1953 at a cost of $140,000; it replaced an earlier Victorian depot built in 1893.

This station is  track from Philadelphia's Suburban Station. In 2017, the average total weekday SEPTA boardings at this station was 1,114 and the average total weekday SEPTA alightings was 1,136.

Paoli Intermodal Transportation Center Project

The Paoli Intermodal Transportation Center (ITC) Project was proposed as a relocation and expansion of the Paoli station to a new site near the existing facility. Improvements in the plans for the new intermodal transportation center included a bridge over the rail tracks (Darby Road which will replace Valley Road), renovation or replacement of the existing station building, new passenger waiting and ticketing facilities, passenger amenities, bus, shuttle, passenger parking facilities, and potential new retail and commercial business development.

Construction for the first phase of the upgraded station commenced in February 2017. The first phase, which cost $48 million, made the station compliant with the Americans with Disabilities Act by replacing the two low-level side platforms with a high-level island platform, constructing a pedestrian overpass over the tracks, and adding elevators and ramps. A ribbon-cutting ceremony for the first phase of the project was held on September 23, 2019, with Amtrak and SEPTA officials, disability rights groups, and area politicians in attendance. The second phase of the station project will replace the North Valley Road bridge. The third phase will turn the station into an intermodal transportation facility by constructing a high-level side platform adjacent to the outbound track, additional amenities for passengers, bus depot facilities, and a parking garage.

Other future plans
The canceled light rail Greenline would have connected Paoli station with the towns of Phoenixville and Oaks, Pennsylvania.

Station layout
Paoli has one center high-level island platform with an overpass allowing passengers to travel from the center platform to the ground level.  Some SEPTA trains terminate/originate here. Originally, the station had four tracks, however the center tracks were removed in 2017 to allow for the construction of the center high-level platform.

Further reading

References

External links

Paoli Station – SEPTA 
Paoli Intermodal Transportation Center Project | Tredyffrin Township 

SEPTA Regional Rail stations
Former Pennsylvania Railroad stations
Railway stations in Chester County, Pennsylvania
Amtrak stations in Pennsylvania
Philadelphia to Harrisburg Main Line
Railway stations in the United States opened in 1893